The 1951–52 Polska Liga Hokejowa season was the 17th season of the Polska Liga Hokejowa, the top level of ice hockey in Poland. Eight teams participated in the league, and Legia Warszawa won the championship.

Final round

5th-8th place

External links
 Season on hockeyarchives.info

Polska
Polska Hokej Liga seasons
1951–52 in Polish ice hockey